Jordi Andree Castell Abusleme (born 3 November 1966 in San Fernando, Chile) is a Chilean photographer and television presenter.

Biography 
During his childhood, his father left Jordi and his mother, Mildred Abusleme de la Vega, to move to France. Castell was raised by his mother and her family. He therefore sees his grandfather Salvador Abusleme as his father figure, something he declared after having meeting his father in the 90s. He's of Palestinian descent.

Castell studied at the San Fernando Institute Marist in his hometown. Then he settled in Talca, where he studied in the Liceo Abate Molina, later finishing high school in Curico, at the Lyceum Luis Cruz Martinez. After living a few years in the cities of Talca and Curico, he moved to the capital, where he started his studies in Audiovisual media at UNIACC. In 1994, he graduated with a Master in Escola Catalana Photography, in Barcelona, Spain.

He has  publicly stated that he is homosexual, and is an important figure in Chilean television.

In 2013, he participated in a video for the presidential campaign of Andres Velasco on the "Join Velasco" to YouTube section.

Career 
He has worked as a consultant to various image media and businesses. For eleven years he worked as a portraitist in the daily Mercury, participating in supplements and newspaper sections such as "Contact Zone", "You" and "Housing and Decoration", among others. He was a columnist in the magazines Blank and Art on the Edge.

During his career he has set seven individual and collective exhibitions twenty, besides being manager and curator of various photographic projects.

Castell has ventured into the world of television. It began as a commentator on shows in the evening program TVN Midnight: Culture and Entertainment, led by Freddy Stock in 2003 also participated in the program SQP of Chilevisión, where it was a space called "Portfolio". After working in Viva la morning (Canal 13), Chilevisión again in 2004, where in recent years has led Damn love and star Close-Up. Moreover, in 2007, participated in the first season of Wicked dancing Channel 13 where he won second place in the competition. In the second season, he participated as a judge.

In his early television career, Jordi Castell was a visionary. He was the first homosexual to show their status and obtain economic returns for his confession. Unlike most gays who populate the small screen, Castell was proud and that distinction led him to have a stable job and very good remuneration.

Academic 
Castell also served as academic director of the School of the Art Direction UNIACC.

Philanthropy 
In 2010 he participated in a campaign of National Women's Service (Sernam) violence against women. The campaign Castell appeared on posters with the phrase "fagot is who mistreats a woman," in addition to spots television saying the same sentence. The campaign was criticized by some agencies that branded discriminatory. The following year again participated in the campaign of Sernam, which uses a similar strategy to that of 2010. Days after the announcement of the campaign pamphlets were distributed in the town of Providencia attacking the driver of television through insults homophobic. The pamphlets were criticized by the Movement for Homosexual Integration and Liberation (Movilh). Meanwhile, Jordi Castell together with Sernam filed a complaint for the offense of threats in order to identify those responsible for the pamphlets.

Controversy 
In December 2011 entering a public dispute with the imitator Stefan Kramer by imitation that makes him specifically mocking his sexual orientation. Threatens to make unknown aspects of public life Kramer. For some people, like the cheerleader Carola Julio, this would be a form of extortion by Castel 
Publicly announced a lawsuit against the imitador. Finally this dispute ends with an economic agreement and the subsequent commitment Kramer to tone down imitations Jordi Castell.

Television

Works

General exhibitions 
 Study narcissism (1992)
 Pictures, Palma de Mallorca, Spain. (1994)
 Pictures (1997)
 Pictures (2000)
 In the water (2001)
 Pictures (2003)
 Woman I (2011)

Art exhibitions 
 Urban Lens 1 and 2 Lucky Strike (2001)
 The other center (2003)
 AM (2003)

References

1966 births
Living people
Chilean LGBT photographers
Chilean gay artists
Gay photographers
Chilean photographers
Chilean people of Catalan descent
Chilean people of Palestinian descent